Akeyla Furbert (born 4 September 1994) is a Bermudian footballer who played as a midfielder for USC Aiken and the Bermuda national team.

Furbert was part of the squad as hosts Bermuda won the 2013 Island Games. In May 2014 she scored in Bermuda's 3–1 win over Saint Kitts and Nevis, which secured her team's place in the final stages of the 2014 CFU Women's Caribbean Cup.

Basketball
While a pupil at Bermuda High School for Girls, Furbert excelled at basketball. She trained with Women's National Basketball Association (WNBA) team Phoenix Mercury in May 2011. After switching to Montverde Academy in Florida, Furbert continued to play basketball alongside football.

See also
List of Bermuda women's international footballers

References

External links
  (name misspelled as Akelyla)
 Akeyla Furbert profile at University of South Carolina Aiken

1994 births
Living people
Bermudian women's footballers
Bermuda women's international footballers
Women's association football midfielders
Expatriate women's soccer players in the United States
Bermudian expatriate footballers
Bermudian expatriate sportspeople in the United States
USC Aiken Pacers women's soccer players
Montverde Academy alumni